The Ho-5 (Army Type 2) was a Japanese aircraft autocannon used during World War II. Developed from the Ho-103 machine gun, it was a version of the American Model 1921 Browning aircraft machine gun. It replaced the Ho-1 and Ho-3 (Army Type 97) in general service. The Ho-5 was belt-fed using typical Browning-style steel disintegrating links.  The cartridge used was a shortened version of the Allied 20 x 110mm Hispano-Suiza HS.404.

The Ho-5 was used mostly as wing mounts in late-war fighters, but saw limited use as cowl mounted in fighters and as flexible mounted (retrofit) in bombers.

Specifications
Caliber: 20mm (0.8 in)
Ammunition: 20 x 94 (84.5 g)
Weight: 37 kg (77 lb)
Rate of fire: 750 rounds/min
Muzzle velocity: 750 m/s (2,460 ft/s)
Magazine: 150-round belt

See also
List of firearms
List of weapons of military aircraft of Germany during World War II
List of common World War II infantry weapons
M2 Browning machine gun

References
 Gunston, Bill "The Illustrated Encyclopedia of Combat Aircraft of World War II" Salamander Books, Ltd. 1978   
 20 mm Aircraft Cannon Ho 5 (Browning Principle)
 Japanese Ammunition
20 mm artillery
Autocannon
Aircraft guns